Aghora is a progressive metal band formed in 1995 by guitarist Santiago Dobles. In 2000 they released their first album, Aghora, recorded and produced by Santiago Dobles and Dan Escauriza in 1999, Miami, Florida. The album featured Sean Malone and Sean Reinert, both members of Cynic. The band released its second album, Formless in 2006, which was produced by Santiago Dobles and mixed by Neil Kernon. in 2019 Aghora released their 3rd album Entheogenic Frequencies which was recorded, mixed and produced by Santiago Dobles.  The album features Gustavo Dobles on keyboards, Matt Thompson (King Diamond) on drums, Alan Goldstein on bass, and Santiago Dobles on guitar.

Members

Current members

Former members 
Max Dible – guitar (1995–1997)
Chris Penny – drums (1995–1997)
Andy Deluca – bass (1995–1999, 2004–2005)
Sean Reinert – drums (1997–2000)
Charlie Ekendahl – guitar (1997–2002)
Danishta Rivero – vocals (1997–2005)
Sean Malone – bass (1999–2000)
Richard Komatz – drums (2001–2002)
Ian Hayes – drums (2004–2005)
Giann Rubio – drums (2006–2007)
Alex Meade - guitar (2005–2006)
Diana Serra – vocals (2006–2009)

Discography

Studio albums 
Aghora (2000)
Formless (2006)
Transitions demo stuff (2006)
Entheogenic Frequencies (album) (2019)

Compilations 
Transitions (2006)

References

External links
 on facebook
Aghora on Myspace
 Interview with Santiago Dobles
 

Musical groups from Miami
American progressive metal musical groups
Musical groups established in 1995
Season of Mist artists